Mickleton is an unincorporated community and census-designated place located within East Greenwich Township in Gloucester County, in the U.S. state of New Jersey. The area is served as United States Postal Service ZIP Code 08056.

As of the 2000 U.S. census, the population for ZIP Code Tabulation Area 08056 was 2,469. However, in more recent years with major suburban housing development, Mickleton along with the rest of East Greenwich has experienced a major population boom.

Mickleton's Quaker roots can still be seen in its "Friend's Meeting House", a Quaker church, and in the "Little Red School House", a schoolhouse building from the 17th and 18th centuries.

Demographics

Education
East Greenwich Township School District serves grades K-6 with students in grades 7-12 served by Kingsway Regional School District.

Guardian Angels Regional School is a K-8 school that operates under the auspices of the Roman Catholic Diocese of Camden. Its PreK-3 campus is in Gibbstown while its 4-8 campus is in Paulsboro.

Notable people

People who were born in, residents of, or otherwise closely associated with Mickleton include:
 Martin A. Herman (born 1939), politician who served in the New Jersey General Assembly, where he represented the 3rd Legislative District from 1974 to 1986, and was later appointed as a judge in New Jersey Superior Court in Gloucester County.

References

External links

Census 2000 Fact Sheet for Zip Code Tabulation Area 08056 from the United States Census Bureau

East Greenwich Township, New Jersey
Census-designated places in New Jersey
Census-designated places in Gloucester County, New Jersey
Unincorporated communities in Gloucester County, New Jersey
Unincorporated communities in New Jersey